"Everybody Wants to Dance Like Josephine Baker" is a 1989 single by German band Boney M. Produced by Barry Blue and recorded by original Boney M. members Marcia Barrett, Bobby Farrell, Maizie Williams and singer Madeleine Davis replacing Liz Mitchell, the single was withdrawn when original producer Frank Farian claimed copyright to the name Boney M. and a court case followed. In France, the single was released credited to Bobby Marcia Maizie Matalyne. To benefit from the fuss that was stirred by the record, Farian rushed out the single "Stories" with a competitive line-up featuring original lead singer Liz Mitchell, Reggie Tsiboe (who replaced Farrell in the group from 1982–86) and two new girls.

Everybody Wants to Dance Like Josephine Baker
A tribute to famed singer and dancer Josephine Baker, the song featured lead and backing vocals by Marcia Barrett and a spoken part by Bobby Farrell. According to a now withdrawn biography by Marcia Barrett, the producers wanted to record Maizie Williams (who had never sung on Boney M.'s records) but try-outs proved unsuccessful. New member Madeleine Davis had another obligation when this song was recorded and couldn't be present in the studio when this was recorded—she did, however, add the chorus answer-back lines "Lose your self-control, feel it in your soul" etc.

Bobby Farrell re-recorded the song for a 1991 single credited to Boney M. feat. Bobby Farrell since he won the rights to use the name Boney M. in the Netherlands where he lived. The title was changed simply to "Josephine Baker", and it was backed with the song "Shame And Scandal". The single was a charity single in support of The Josephine Baker Children's Foundation.

Custer Jammin'
The B-side track was a story about George Armstrong Custer and the Battle of the Little Bighorn. Madeleine Davis did the lead vocals although the key proved too low for her. Bobby Farrell did a spoken part, and Marcia Barrett backing vocals.

Releases
UK
7"
 "Everybody Wants To Dance Like Josephine Baker" – 3:37 / " Custer Jammin" – 4:15 (PWL PWS 004, 1989, withdrawn)

12"
 "Everybody Wants To Dance Like Josephine Baker" (12" Mix) – 6:45 / "Custer Jammin" – 4:15 / "Everybody Wants To Dance Like Josephine Baker" (PWL PWCS 004, 1989, withdrawn)
CD
 "Everybody Wants To Dance Like Josephine Baker" (12" Mix) – 6:45 / "Custer Jammin" – 4:15 / "Everybody Wants To Dance Like Josephine Baker" (PWL PWCS 004, 1989, withdrawn)

Netherlands
7"
 "Josephine Baker" (according to the label, cover says: "A Tribute To Josephine Baker" – 4:25 / Shame And Scandal – 3:51 (Music Productions BS 800 Stemra)

References

External links
 Rateyourmusic.com 

Songs about dancing
1989 singles
Boney M. songs
1989 songs
Cultural depictions of Josephine Baker
Pete Waterman Entertainment singles
Songs about entertainers